The 2008 Massachusetts House of Representatives elections were held on November 4, 2008, the same date as the 2008 Massachusetts Senate election as well as Federal and Congressional elections. The term of Representatives elected is two years, January 2009 until January 2011.

Contests in 2008

See also
 List of Massachusetts General Courts

References

External links
http://www.boston.com/news/politics/2008/election_results/ma_statehouse/
 

House
House 2008
Massachusetts House of Representatives